The 1984 Virginia Slims of Los Angeles was a women's tennis tournament played on outdoor hard courts at the Manhattan Country Club in Manhattan Beach, California in the United States that was part of the 1984 Virginia Slims World Championship Series. The tournament was held from October 1 through October 7, 1984. First-seeded Chris Evert-Lloyd won the singles title.

Finals

Singles
 Chris Evert-Lloyd defeated  Wendy Turnbull 6–2, 6–3
It was Evert-Lloyd's 5th singles title of the year and the 131st of her career.

Doubles
 Chris Evert-Lloyd /  Wendy Turnbull defeated  Bettina Bunge /  Eva Pfaff 6–2, 6–4
 It was Evert-Lloyd's 5th title of the year and the 152nd of her career. It was Turnbull's 2nd title of the year and the 57th of her career.

See also
 1984 Union 76 Pacific Southwest Open – men's tournament

References

External links
 ITF tournament edition details
 Tournament draws

Los Angeles
LA Women's Tennis Championships
Virginia Slims of Los Angeles
Virginia Slims of Los Angeles
Virginia Slims of Los Angeles
Virginia Slims of Los Angeles